Southside Independent School District is a public school district located in southern Bexar County, Texas (USA). It serves the far south side of the city of San Antonio.

In 2009, the school district was rated "academically acceptable" by the Texas Education Agency.

Origins
Southside ISD began as a $1 sale of land to Bexar County from Julian C. Gallardo for the purpose of education.

Schools
Southside High School 
9th Grade Academy
Julius L. Matthey Middle School 
Losoya Intermediate School 
Heritage Elementary School 
Freedom Elementary School 
Julian C. Gallardo Elementary school
W.M. Pearce Primary School

References

External links
Southside ISD

School districts in Bexar County, Texas